Scybalistodes is a genus of moths of the family Crambidae described by Eugene G. Munroe in 1964.

Species
Scybalistodes fortis 
Scybalistodes illosalis (Dyar, 1914)
Scybalistodes periculosalis Dyar, 1908
Scybalistodes prusalis (Druce, 1895)
Scybalistodes reducta 
Scybalistodes regularis 
Scybalistodes rivuloides 
Scybalistodes vermiculalis 
Scybalistodes violetalis

References

Glaphyriinae
Taxa named by Eugene G. Munroe
Crambidae genera